Dr.  Sanjay Mahavir Ram Paswan (born 2 May 1962) is an Indian BJP politician. He was Minister of state of Human Resource Development in Vajpayee's government.

He was elected to 13th Lok Sabha from Nawada constituency of Bihar. He is former National President,  BJP SC Morcha and presently national executive member of Bharatiya Janata Party.

He was elected as MLC in Bihar on 6 May 2018 representing BJP. Paswan unsuccessfully contested 2005 Assembly Election on RJD symbol. Paswan spent his time serving several political parties including RJD, Congress and Lok Janshakti Party and finally returned to the BJP in 2008.

He has penned many books and contributed to many, his best book being " Encyclopedia of Dalits".

His brother Ajay Paswan was mayor in Darbhanga Municipal Corporation  from 2007 to 2011.

References

External links
 http://myneta.info/loksabha2004/candidate.php?candidate_id=742

Lok Sabha members from Bihar
Bharatiya Janata Party politicians from Bihar
1962 births
Living people
Patna University alumni
Members of the Bihar Legislative Council
People from Darbhanga district
Indian National Congress politicians from Bihar
Lok Janshakti Party politicians
Rashtriya Janata Dal politicians